The Haly's tree skink (Dasia haliana) is a species of tree skink found in Sri Lanka. Earlier thought to be found also in the Western Ghats, taxonomic studies have shown this to be a Sri Lankan endemic, differentiated from the Indian Dasia subcaeruleum. It is the only arboreal skink in Sri Lanka.

Description
This arboreal skink, about 8 cm long, in the genus Dasia is distinct from all other sister species in having a smaller number of scale rows at the mid-body (22-24) and an enlarged set of vertebral row scales.

Like other reptiles their taxonomic identification is based on scalation. They have a pointed snout and the distance of the nostril to tip is longer than the diameter of the eye. The scales above the nostril are not in contact with each other and the fronto-nasal scale is equal in width and length. The prefrontals are large and are separated from another narrow frontal. The interparietal scale is variable in size and when large separates the parietals. There are a pair of nuchal (nape) scales, four scales above the eye with the second being largest and the first and second in contact with the frontal. There are 7 or 8 supraciliaries, with the first being longer than the others. There are two loreals which are longer than their height. The temporal scales are larger than the scales on the sides of the neck. The tympanum of the ear is sunken and is less than a fourth of the diameter of the eye.

The dorsal scales have 3 or 5 blunt keels, two vertebral rows of scales are wider than the rest. The tail tapers to a point and is as long as the head and body. The limbs are short, the toes are long with 17 or 18 lamellae (or plate like scales) beneath the fourth toe. The palms and soles have flat tubercles with larger ones on the heel, especially in the male.

The colouration is yellowish-olive above, with broad black bands which are as wide as the space between them. There are 5 or 6 of these bands on the neck and body with a black mark on the occiput extending forward as streaks on top of the head. There are two lateral stripes passing through the eye and nostril. The underside is yellow.

Habitat and distribution
This is the only arboreal skink in Sri Lanka. Known much from the dry zone of the country, including Pallegama, Dambulla, Polonnaruwa, Bakamuna, Horana, Anuradhapura, Palatupana, Gampaha and Jaffna. It was also reported from southern India but the species that occurs there was found to be different and given the name of Dasia johnsinghi.

Ecology
Confined to the dry zone plains, where they are found on large trees, occupying tree holes as refuge.

Reproduction
Copulation is known in late January and 2 eggs are produced in early March.

References

Other sources
 Annandale, Nelson 1906 New and interesting lizards in the Colombo Museum. Spol. Zeyl. 3: 189-192
 Deraniyagala,P.E.P. 1931 Some Ceylon Lizards. Ceylon J. Sci. B, 16: 139-180
 Greer, Allen Eddy Jr. 1970 The Relationships of the Skinks Referred to the Genus Dasia. Breviora 348:1-30
 Joshua J; Sekar A G 1985 Range extension of the skink Dasia haliana (H. Nevill, 1887). J. Bombay Nat. Hist. Soc. 82 (2): 422-423
 Karthikeyan S 1991 Sighting of the arboreal skink Dasia haliana at Mundanthurai Wildlife Sanctuary, Tamil Nadu. J. Bombay Nat. Hist. Soc. 88 (1): 122-123

haliana
Reptiles of Sri Lanka
Endemic fauna of Sri Lanka
Reptiles described in 1887
Taxa named by Amyrald Haly
Taxa named by Hugh Nevill